Aleksandr Zolotarev (born 13 March 1940) is a Soviet athlete. He competed in the men's triple jump at the 1968 Summer Olympics.

References

External links
 

1940 births
Living people
Athletes (track and field) at the 1968 Summer Olympics
Soviet male triple jumpers
Olympic athletes of the Soviet Union
Universiade medalists in athletics (track and field)
Universiade silver medalists for the Soviet Union